Gilardo Gilardi (May 25, 1889 - January 16, 1963) was an Argentine composer, pianist, and conductor who was the eponym of the Gilardo Gilardi Conservatory of Music in La Plata, Buenos Aires.

He was born in San Fernando, Argentina and first learned music from his father before studying with the composer Arturo Berutti in Buenos Aires. He began composing as a teenager and he premiered his first opera, Ilse, at Teatro Colón opera house, aged 23. He co-founded the group Renovación (Renovation) in 1929, but left three years later, in 1932. He was professor at the University of La Plata and wrote an elementary course on harmony. Gilardi experimented with the pentatonic scale and Americas' Indigenous music. Some of their works are the operas Ilse (1923) and La leyenda del Urutaú (The legend of the Urutaú) (1935), Primera serie argentina, (First Argentine series), Evocación quechua, Gaucho con botas nuevas (Gaucho with new boots) (1938, orchestra), a symphonic poem which won a national prize in 1939. Among his religious music Réquiem (1933) and Misa de Gloria (Glory Mass) (1936) are particularly esteemed. He also composed chamber music pieces: Sonata for violin and piano, Songs for voice and piano, Argentine popular Sonata for violin and piano and various piano pieces.

Gilardi's pupils included Regina Benavente, Ana Serrano Redonnet, Julia Stilman-Lasansky, and Susana Baron Supervielle.

Works 
Ilse, opera based on a Libretto of Cosimo Giogeri Contri, 1919, UA 13 July 1923
La leyenda del urutaú, opera based on a Libretto of José Oliva Nogueira, 1929, UA 25 October 1934
Primera serie argentina
Evocación quechua
Réquiem, 1933
Misa de Gloria, 1936
Gaucho con botas nuevas, symphonic poem, 1938
Ollantay, incidental music for the play of Ricardo Rojas, 1939
Sonata para violín y piano
Canciones para canto y piano
Sonata popular argentina para violín y piano

References

1889 births
1963 deaths
Argentine composers
People from San Fernando de la Buena Vista
Argentine people of Italian descent